Shaun Ontong (born 25 March 1987 in Canberra, Australia) is a retired Australian footballer and coach who is current assistant coach of Yokohama F. Marinos.

His father, Paul Ontong, was born in South Africa and played in the NSL for Canberra City, Mooroolbark SC and Brisbane Lions.

Club career
Ontong grew up in Canberra, playing junior football for local clubs Belwest Foxes and later Belconnen United. In 2006, he was awarded a place in the AIS football program. In late 2006, he trialled with German club 1. FC Nürnberg, but suffered a groin injury during the trial and returned to Australia. He spent time briefly with Melbourne Victory before heading back to Europe, trialling with FC Sion and later in Slovenia with NK Maribor and Bela Krajina, but his recurrent injury forced another return home. In June 2007, he signed with Adelaide United on a one-year contract, followed by a two-year contract with the Newcastle Jets in April 2008. , he was playing with Oakleigh Cannons in the Victorian Premier League.

International career
Ontong received 10 caps at international U20 level and captained the Young Socceroos through the AFC Youth Championship 2006 campaign.

A-League career statistics
()

Football academy
In 2013 Ontong and fellow Canberran Kaz Patafta set up a football academy in Canberra, Ontong Patafta Football Academy.

References

External links
 Ontong Patafta Football Academy
 
 Profile at ultimatealeague.com (to 2010). Accessed 11 November 2012

1987 births
Living people
Sportspeople from Canberra
Soccer players from the Australian Capital Territory
Australian soccer players
Adelaide United FC players
Newcastle Jets FC players
A-League Men players
Australian Institute of Sport soccer players
Kerala Blasters FC non-playing staff
Association football fullbacks